Terry Wilson (born c. 1942) is a former Canadian football player who played for the Calgary Stampeders and Edmonton Eskimos. He won the Grey Cup with Calgary in 1971. He played college football at Stanford University.

Wilson was born in Montreal but moved to San Francisco as a child.

References

1940s births
Living people
Calgary Stampeders players
Edmonton Elks players
Stanford Cardinal football players
Canadian football running backs
American football halfbacks
Canadian emigrants to the United States
Players of Canadian football from Quebec
Canadian football people from Montreal
Players of Canadian football from San Francisco